Johnsonella is a Gram-negative, non-spore-forming and non-motil bacterial genus from the family of Lachnospiraceae with one known species (Johnsonella ignava). Johnsonella ignava occur in the gingival crevice of humans.

References

Lachnospiraceae
Monotypic bacteria genera
Bacteria genera